The Gulf 12 Hours is a 12-hour annual GT endurance racing event that usually takes place at the Yas Marina Circuit in the United Arab Emirates except in January 2021 when it was held at the Bahrain International Circuit. It has been held since 2013. On 29 July 2022, it was announced that Gulf 12 Hours will join to the Intercontinental GT Challenge calendar both in 2022 and 2023.

Winners

References

External links 
 

Endurance motor racing
Auto races in the United Arab Emirates